The French Sailing Federation (FFV) is recognised by the International Sailing Federation as the governing body for the sport of sailing in France.

The federation was originally called the Fédération de yachting à voile.

References

External links
FFV Official Website
ISAF MNA Microsite

France
Sailing
Yachting associations
Sailing governing bodies
1946 establishments in France